Jacobus Hercules "Koos" van der Merwe (born 4 August 1937) is a South African former politician. He was a member of the South African Parliament, representing the National Party, Conservative Party and the Inkatha Freedom Party (IFP). He was a member of the House of Assembly and later the South African National Assembly between 1977 and 2014, being the longest serving member of Parliament at the time of his retirement.

Personal life 
Van der Merwe was born on 4 August 1937 in the Orange Free State. He studied at the University of Pretoria before working as an insurer. He then earned a diploma in law from the University of South Africa and later qualified as a lawyer. In the early 1990s, he lived in Johannesburg.

Political career 
Van der Merwe first got involved in politics as a child by helping put up posters for the National Party at the 1948 South African general election. He was elected as a member of Parliament for Jeppe representing the National Party in 1977. He gained a reputation as a political maverick, reportedly once driving up to a tollgate and shooting it in protest of their imposition. In 1982, he was part of the split of the National Party by founding the Conservative Party after storming out of a meeting stating: "I'm finished with that bloody progressive P. W. Botha". He then moved constituency and was elected as a Conservative in Overvaal.

When the State President F. W. de Klerk announced the end of apartheid in 1990, van der Merwe threatened that the Conservative Party would work to mobilise Afrikaners against the government and led a strike in Pretoria. He also addressed Nelson Mandela directly, calling on him to renounce African National Congress violence and recognise the rights of Afrikaner self-determination. Mandela would respond in Afrikaans that he was looking forward to discussing it with van der Merwe. However, in 1992 van der Merwe was expelled from the Conservative Party for "ignoring party discipline" in calling for negotiations with the African National Congress for a smaller Volkstaat.

He spent the next 18 months as an independent politician, ironically saying he represented the "Desert Party" and intended to retire at the next election. In 1993, he joined the IFP on the grounds he shared their federalist viewpoints. He was persuaded to stand at the 1994 South African general election and was re-elected and became the IFP's Chief Whip, a position he held until retirement. In 2006, he was ejected from the chamber for waving a cake at a government minister while demanding a meeting with President Thabo Mbeki, saying "Here is your cake, come and eat it! I have been waiting for a year." The cake was left in the chamber where it was consumed by members from the Democratic Alliance. He served in the National Assembly until retiring before the 2014 South African general election. Despite retiring, he has still given political opinions to newspapers.

References 

1937 births
People from the Free State (province)
National Party (South Africa) politicians
Conservative Party (South Africa) politicians
Inkatha Freedom Party politicians
20th-century South African lawyers
Members of the House of Assembly (South Africa)
Members of the National Assembly of South Africa
University of Pretoria alumni
University of South Africa alumni
Afrikaner people
Living people